Vanderbilt is a surname, and may refer to:

Amy Vanderbilt (1908–1974), American authority on etiquette, distant relative of the Vanderbilt family
Arthur T. Vanderbilt (1888–1957), noted American attorney, legal educator, and proponent of court modernization, Chief Justice of the New Jersey Supreme Court 1948–1957
John Vanderbilt (1819–1877), American lawyer and politician from New York
Jarred Vanderbilt (1999-), American professional basketball player for the Los Angeles Lakers
The Vanderbilt family, a prominent family in the United States, including:
Alfred Gwynne Vanderbilt (1877–1915), wealthy American sportsman, son of Cornelius Vanderbilt II
Alfred Gwynne Vanderbilt Jr. (1912–1999), American proponent of thoroughbred racing, son of Alfred Gwynne Vanderbilt
Alfred Gwynne Vanderbilt III (1949-), Business executive, son of Alfred Gwynne Vanderbilt Jr.
Alice Vanderbilt Morris (1874–1950), co-founder of the IALA, daughter of Margaret Louisa Vanderbilt Shepard
Cathleen Vanderbilt (1904–1944), daughter of Reginald Claypoole Vanderbilt
Consuelo Vanderbilt (1877–1964), daughter of William Kissam Vanderbilt, wife of Charles Spencer-Churchill, 9th Duke of Marlborough
Cornelia Stuyvesant Vanderbilt (1900–1976), daughter of George Washington Vanderbilt II
Cornelius Jeremiah Vanderbilt (1830–1882), son of "Commodore" Cornelius Vanderbilt
Cornelius Vanderbilt (1794–1877), known as "Commodore" Vanderbilt, American industrialist and philanthropist, patriarch of the Vanderbilt family; married Frank Armstrong Crawford Vanderbilt 
Cornelius Vanderbilt II (1843–1899), American socialite, heir, and businessman, son of William Henry Vanderbilt and a grandson of "Commodore" Cornelius Vanderbilt; married Alice Claypoole Vanderbilt
Cornelius Vanderbilt III (1873–1942), American military officer, inventor, engineer, and yachtsman, son of Cornelius Vanderbilt II; married Grace Vanderbilt
Cornelius Vanderbilt IV (1898–1974), American newspaper publisher, the son of Cornelius Vanderbilt III
Cornelius Vanderbilt Whitney (1899–1992), American businessman, film producer, writer, government official, and owner of a leading stable of thoroughbred racehorses, son of Gertrude Vanderbilt Whitney
Eliza Osgood Vanderbilt Webb (1860–1936), daughter of William Henry Vanderbilt
Emily Thorn Vanderbilt (1852–1946), daughter of William Henry Vanderbilt
Emily Vanderbilt Sloane (1874–1970), American philanthropist, daughter of Emily Thorn Vanderbilt
Florence Adele Vanderbilt Twombly (1854–1952), daughter of William Henry Vanderbilt
Frederick Vanderbilt Field (1905–2000), American leftist political activist, grandson of Emily Thorn Vanderbilt
Frederick William Vanderbilt (1856–1938), American railroad director, son of William Henry Vanderbilt; married Louise Vanderbilt
George Henry Vanderbilt Cecil (1925–2020), American dairy industry businessman, son of Cornelia Stuyvesant Vanderbilt and grandson of George Washington Vanderbilt II
George Washington Vanderbilt II (1862–1914), American businessman, the son of William Henry Vanderbilt
George Washington Vanderbilt III (1914–1961), American yachtsman and scientific explorer, a son of Alfred Gwynne Vanderbilt I
Gertrude Vanderbilt Whitney (1875–1942), an American sculptor, art patron, and art collector, prominent social figure and hostess, founder of the Whitney Museum of American Art, a daughter of Cornelius Vanderbilt II
Gladys Vanderbilt Széchenyi (1886–1965), daughter of Cornelius Vanderbilt II, wife of Hungarian Count László Széchenyi
Gloria Vanderbilt (1924–2019), American artist, author, actress, heiress, socialite, and early developer of designer blue jeans, daughter of Reginald Claypoole Vanderbilt
Harold Stirling Vanderbilt (1884–1970), American railroad executive, yachtsman, and champion bridge player, a son of William Kissam Vanderbilt; married Gertrude Conaway Vanderbilt.
James Vanderbilt (born 1975), American screenwriter, grandson of Alfred Gwynne Vanderbilt Jr.
Margaret Louisa Vanderbilt Shepard (1845–1924), supporter of the YMCA, daughter of William Henry Vanderbilt
Muriel Vanderbilt (1900–1972), American racehorse owner/breeder, daughter of William Kissam Vanderbilt II
Reginald Claypoole Vanderbilt (1880–1925), American millionaire equestrian, son of Cornelius Vanderbilt II; married Gloria Morgan Vanderbilt
William Amherst Vanderbilt Cecil (1928–2017), American businessman, son of Cornelia Stuyvesant Vanderbilt and grandson of George Washington Vanderbilt II
William Henry Vanderbilt (1821–1885), American businessman, son of "Commodore" Cornelius Vanderbilt
William Henry Vanderbilt III (1901–1981), American bus executive and Rhode Island politician, Governor of Rhode Island 1939-1941, son of Alfred Gwynne Vanderbilt
William Kissam Vanderbilt (1849–1920), American railroad executive and horse breeder, son of William Henry Vanderbilt; married Anne Harriman Vanderbilt
William Kissam Vanderbilt II (1878–1944), American motor racing enthusiast and yachtsman, son of William Kissam Vanderbilt; married Virginia Fair Vanderbilt

See also

Surnames of Dutch origin
Dutch-language surnames